Klyazminsky Gorodok is a rural locality (a selo) and the administrative center of Klyazminskoye Rural Settlement, Kovrovsky District, Vladimir Oblast, Russia. The population was 919 as of 2010. There are 11 streets.

Geography 
Klyazminsky Gorodok is located on the right bank of the Klyazma River, 17 km northeast of Kovrov (the district's administrative centre) by road. Golyshevo is the nearest rural locality.

References 

Rural localities in Kovrovsky District